The Hirota–Satsuma equation is a set of three coupled nonlinear partial differential equations:

The Hirota–Satsuma equation appeared in the theory of shallow water waves, first discussed by Hirota, Ryogo and Satsuma, Junkichi in 1976. The equation has multiple soliton solutions and traveling wave solutions.

References

Graham W. Griffiths William E. Schiesser Traveling Wave Analysis of Partial Differential p. 135 Equations Academy Press
 Richard H. Enns George C. McGuire, Nonlinear Physics Birkhauser,1997
Inna Shingareva, Carlos Lizárraga-Celaya, Solving Nonlinear Partial Differential Equations with Maple Springer.
Eryk Infeld and George Rowlands, Nonlinear Waves, Solitons and Chaos, Cambridge University Press 2000
Saber Elaydi, An Introduction to Difference Equations, Springer 2000
Dongming Wang, Elimination Practice, Imperial College Press 2004
 David Betounes, Partial Differential Equations for Computational Science: With Maple and Vector Analysis Springer, 1998 
 George Articolo, Partial Differential Equations & Boundary Value Problems with Maple V Academic Press 1998 

Nonlinear partial differential equations